Claire McGill MLA is a nationalist politician in Northern Ireland. She sat in the Northern Ireland Assembly from 2007 to 2011, representing West Tyrone as a member of Sinn Féin.

McGill also represented Sinn Féin for the Glenelly Electoral Area on Strabane District Council from 2001 to 2011.

References

External links
 Northern Ireland Assembly official website, members Bio

Year of birth missing (living people)
Living people
People from County Tyrone
Northern Ireland MLAs 2007–2011
Female members of the Northern Ireland Assembly
Sinn Féin MLAs
Sinn Féin councillors in Northern Ireland